This is a list of ethnic interest groups in Canada, often engaged in diaspora politics.

These are advocacy groups in Canada that are established along cultural, ethnic, religious, or racial lines by an ethnic group for the purposes of protecting and advancing the interests of their particular social group either within Canada or abroad—as in the case of foreign policy interest group—through (directly or indirectly) influencing Canadian foreign policy.

This list is organized according to the ethnic divisions used by Statistics Canada.

African

Southern and East African 

 Ugandan Canadian National Association

Asian

East and Southeast Asian 

 Chinese Canadian National Council
 Federation of Korean-Canadian Associations
 Indonesian Canadian Congress
 National Association of Japanese Canadians
 National Council of Canadian-Filipino Associations
 Taiwanese Canadian Association of Toronto
 Vietnamese Canadian Federation

South Asian 

 Canada India Foundation
 Canadian Malayalee Association
 Christian Cultural Association of South Asians
 Federation of Tamil Sangams of North America
 National Association of Canadians of Origins in India
 National Federation of Pakistani Canadians

West Central Asian and Middle Eastern 

 Armenian National Committee of Canada
 Canadian Arab Federation
 Federation of Canadian Turkish Association
 National Council on Canada-Arab Relations

Caribbean 

 National Council of Jamaicans and Supportive Organizations in Canada
 National Council of Barbadian Associations in Canada
 National Council of Trinidad and Tobago Organizations in Canada

European

Central European 
 German Canadian Congress
 German Society of Montreal

Eastern European 

 Belarusan Canadian Coordination Committee
 Canadian Polish Congress
 Czech and Slovak Association of Canada
 Federation of Russian Canadians
 Latvian National Federation of Canada
 Slovak Canadian National Council

Ukrainian 

 Association of United Ukrainian Canadians
 Ukrainian Canadian Congress (umbrella organization)
 Ukrainian Canadian Civil Liberties Association
 Ukrainian Canadian Students' Union
 Ukrainians in Canada for Democratic Ukraine
 Ukrainian National Federation of Canada
 Ukrainian Youth Association

Northern European 

 Federation of Danish Associations in Canada

Southern European 

 Canadian Hispanic Congress
 Canadian Hellenic Congress
 Cypriot Federation of Canada
 National Congress of Italian Canadians
 Portuguese Canadian National Congress
 Serbian National Shield Society of Canada
 Slovenian National Federation of Canada
 United Macedonians Organizations of Canada

Indigenous 

 Congress of Aboriginal Peoples

First Nations 

 Assembly of First Nations

Inuit 

 Inuit Tapiriit Kanatami
 Tunngavik Federation of Nunavut

Métis 

 Métis National Council

Jewish 

 Canadian Jewish Congress
 Canadian Jewish Political Affairs Committee

Québécois 

 Mouvement national des Québécoises et des Québécois
 Mouvement Québec français
 Saint-Jean-Baptiste Society

See also
 Ethnic interest group
 Ethnic interest groups in the United States

References 

 
Canada
Ethnic
Ethnic